was a private Junior College in the city of Hachiōji, Tokyo, Japan. It was established as specialized school in 1960. It became Junior college in 2004. The school closed on March 31, 2012.

External links
 Yamazaki College of Animal Health Technology

Educational institutions established in 2004
Private universities and colleges in Japan
Japanese junior colleges
Universities and colleges in Tokyo
Western Metropolitan Area University Association
2004 establishments in Japan